Engine House No. 10 is a historic firehouse located at 1341 Maryland Ave., NE., Washington, D.C., in the Stanton Park neighborhood, just north of Capitol Hill.

History
It was built in 1894–95. It was listed on the National Register of Historic Places in 2008.

The firehouse is one of eight designed by Leon E. Dessez in Washington.

Engine Company 10 was formed on July 2, 1895, at this firehouse and was equipped with an 1884 Clapp & Jones 450 GPM steam fire engine and an 1895 McDermott Bros. hose reel carriage. In 1940 it moved to a firehouse on Florida Avenue.

References

Fire stations completed in 1895
Defunct fire stations in Washington, D.C.
Fire stations on the National Register of Historic Places in Washington, D.C.
Queen Anne architecture in Washington, D.C.
Capitol Hill